United People's Democratic Front ( UPDF) is a regional political party based in the Chittagong Hill Tracts of Bangladesh. Chakmas form the majority ethnic group in the party. The United People's Democratic Front claims to seek a fully autonomous Hill Tracts through peaceful and democratic means. However, many of its members are armed and have expressed violent Buddhist extremist behaviour.

Founding
The United People's Democratic Front was founded on 26 December 1998 at a conference in Dhaka. At the end of the conference, a five-member convening committee was formed with Prasit Bikash Khisha as its convener.

In November 2006, Prasit Bikash Khisha was elected to presidency by the party's central committee during a congress in Dhaka. In the same meeting, Rabi Shankar Chakma became the new general secretary.

Elections
The UPDF took part in the eighth national parliamentary elections in 2001 and though failed to win in any of the two seats in CHT it contested, the party received a considerable number of votes cast, to the surprise of many analysts.

History
In July 2021, the party's Joan Chakma led a contingent of Buddhist-Chakmas to Suandrapara, a village of the Bawm Christian convert community, where they issued threats and conducted two violent raids leading damaging a church. Towards the end of the same month, four of the party's members were arrested for extortion.

References 

1998 establishments in Bangladesh
Political parties established in 1998
Political parties in Bangladesh